Henry John Enthoven (4 June 1903 – 29 June 1975) was an English first-class cricketer who was born in Cartagena, Spain, and was educated at Harrow School and Pembroke College, Cambridge. He played in 123 first-class matches for Middlesex County Cricket Club, as a right-handed batsman and right-arm medium bowler between 1923 and 1936, scoring 4478 runs and taking 100 wickets. He shared the county captaincy with Nigel Haig in 1933 and 1934. He later served as the club treasurer.

He died in Kensington, London aged 72.

References

External links

 
 

1903 births
1975 deaths
Alumni of Pembroke College, Cambridge
Cambridge University cricketers
English cricketers
Free Foresters cricketers
Gentlemen cricketers
H. D. G. Leveson Gower's XI cricketers
Marylebone Cricket Club cricketers
Middlesex cricketers
English cricket captains
Middlesex cricket captains
People educated at Harrow School
Sportspeople from Cartagena, Spain